David Davidson (born 20 August 1934) is a Scottish footballer, who played as a wing half in the Football League for Manchester City and Workington.

References

Manchester City F.C. players
Living people
1934 births
Workington A.F.C. players
English Football League players
Association football wing halves
Scottish footballers
Footballers from Glasgow
People from Govanhill and Crosshill